Dead End or dead end may refer to:
 Dead end (street), a street connected only at one end with other streets, called by many other official names, including cul-de-sac.

Film and television
 The Dead End (1914 film), directed by David Hartford
 Dead End (1937 film), a crime drama film
 Dead End (1969 film), a Hong Kong film by Chang Cheh
 Dead End (1969 Italian film), an Italian film starring Andrea Giordana and Evelyn Stewart
 Dead End (1977 film), an Iranian film
 Dead End (1985 US comedy-horror-thriller)
 Dead End Drive-In, an Australian 1986 film 
 Dead End (1998 film), an American film starring Eric Roberts
 Dead End (1999 film), an Australian film by Iren Koster and starring William Snow
 Dead End (2003 film), a film by Jean-Baptiste Andrea and Fabrice Canepa
 Dead End (2006 film) or No Exit, a 2006 Israeli film
 Dead End (2013 film), a South Korean mystery thriller
 Batman: Dead End, a 2003 fan film by Sandy Collora
 The Dead End, a 2015 Chinese film
 "Dead End" (seaQuest DSV), a 1994 episode of seaQuest DSV
 "Dead End" (Angel), a 2001 episode of Angel
 Dead End (Transformers), several robot supervillain characters in the Transformers robot superhero franchise.
 Dead End: Paranormal Park, a 2022 animated web series on Netflix
 Dead End, a web show on Cartoon Hangover

Music
 Dead End, a 1977 album by Japanese rock band Godiego
 Dead End (band), an influential Japanese metal-rock band formed in 1984
 Dead End (Turbo album), 1990
 Dead End, a 2001 album by The Newlydeads
 "Dead End", a song by the Dead Kennedys
 "Dead End", a 2003 song by Sam Roberts from We Were Born in a Flame
 "Dead End", a song by In Flames from Come Clarity
 "Dead Ends", a 2006 song by Chad VanGaalen from Skelliconnection
 "Dead End", a song by Master Shortie from A.D.H.D
 "Dead END", a 2012 song by Faylan, the second opening theme for Future Diary
 Dead End EP, an EP by Kristofer Åström and Hidden Trucks
 Dead End, an album by Seventh Star

Literature and theatre
 Dead End (manga), a 2001 manga published in English by Tokyopop
 No Exit or Dead End, a 1944 play by Jean-Paul Sartre
 Dead End (play), a 1935 play by Pulitzer prize winner Sidney Kingsley
 Dead End, an event in the manga series Future Diary where a player dies
 Death's End (死神永生), a 2010 novel by Liu Cixin, is sometimes translated as Dead End

See also
 Dead End Street, a 1982 film directed by Yaky Yosha
 "Dead End Street" (song), a 1966 song by The Kinks
 Cul-de-sac (disambiguation)
 Dead-end tower, a type of transmission tower